Anwarul Kabir Chowdhury Politician of Nilphamari District of Bangladesh and former member of Parliament for Nilphamari-3 constituency in February 1996.

Career 
Anwarul Kabir Chowdhury was elected to parliament from Nilphamari-3 as a Bangladesh Nationalist Party candidate in 15 February 1996 Bangladeshi general election.

References 

Living people
Year of birth missing (living people)
People from Nilphamari District
Bangladesh Nationalist Party politicians
6th Jatiya Sangsad members